The following is an incomplete list of large mosques in Afghanistan:

See also 

Islam in Afghanistan
Lists of mosques

References

 
Afghanistan
Mosques